

Canadian public housing projects

Alberta

 Edmonton
 Ekota 1 projects
 Ekota Manor
 Duggan projects (Near Southgate Mall)
 Menisa 1 projects
 Satoo 1 projects

British Columbia

 Vancouver
  Woodward's building
 Stamps Place (RayCam Projects)
 MacLean Park
 Skeena Terrace
 Little Mountain (33rd Projects)
 Orchard Park (Nanaimo Projects)
 The Tyee Article Stop Gap Housing in Vancouver

Manitoba

 Winnipeg
 Lord Selkirk Park
 Gilbert Park

Nova Scotia
In more recent decades Metro Housing has built smaller developments integrated into existing neighbourhoods. These are individually not notable enough to be included in this list.

 Halifax
Ahern Manor
Alderney Manor
Bayers-Westwood (Romans/Federal Ave)
Creighton/Gerrish/Göttingen Streets (various)
Gordon B. Isnor Manor (senior citizens)
Greystone Housing Complex (Spryfield)
H. P. MacKeen Manor
Joseph Howe Manor
Mulgrave Park
Nova Court
North Dartmouth (various)
Sir John Thompson Manor
Sunrise Manor (senior citizens)
The Hydrostone (originally administered by the Halifax Relief Commission, now privately owned)
Uniacke Square

Newfoundland and Labrador
 Corner Brook
Dunfield Park
 St. John's
Buckmaster's Circle

Ontario
Brantford
 Eastdale Gardens
 Cedarview Apartments
 Brier Park Houses
 Parkview Heights
 North Park Towers
 Lynden Towers
 Tollgate Houses
 Applegate Complex
 Northland Gardens
 Riverside Gardens
 Westglen Gardens
 Cooper Towers
 Brant Manor Apartments
 Dornia Manor Apartments
 Holmedale Apartments
 Hazelview Projects
 Centennial Towers
 Dorchester Apartments
 City Centre Apartments
 Daleview Gardens
 Lynnwood Projects
 Chatham Apartments
 Darling Apartments
 372 Darling Street
 Winston Court
 Sherwood Apartments
 Winniett Apartments
 John Noble Apartments
 Slovak Apartments
 Munro Houses
 Northview Projects
 Alfred Heights
 Colborne Street Apartments
 Village Tower
 Brierwood gardens
 Silver Pines
 Counsel Park Apartments
 West Gate Apartments
 Y Apartments
 Dalhousie Apartments
 Phoenix Apartments
 Heritage House
 Albion Towers
 Hayhurst Projects
 Newport Aparments
 Burlington
 The Manor
 Bonnie Place II
 Hamilton
 Barlake Buildings
 Oriole Crescent
 Jamesville Houses
 John Street Buildings
 Kenora Townhouses
 Lang Street Houses
 Lake Ave Houses
 Congress Apartments
 Ferguson Buildings
 Sanford Ave. Building
 500 MacNab
 170 Jackson
 Picton Street Houses
 Guise Street co-op Apartments
 Grandville Buildings
 Queens
 Quigley Buildings
 Kingston
 Rideau Heights
 Compton Street
 1130 Montreal Street
 300/312 Conacher Drive
 381/205 Bagot Street
 375 Patrick Street
 37 Cassidy
 234-266 Guthrie Drive
 257 Rideau Street
 37/41 Joseph Street
 700/710 Division Street
 Barbara Avenue
 416 Elliot Avenue
 645 Brock Street
 111-129 Van Order Drive
 Cliff Crescent
 Curtis Crescent
 55 Notch Hill Road
 1338 Princess Street
 Canatara Court
 London
 Boulee Street, George Nace Gardens
 Pond Mills Road, Allen Rush Gardens
 580 Dundas Street
 Kipps Lane
 Marconi
 Limberlost
 Southdale
 241 Simcoe Street
 Huron Street
 Ottawa
Gloucester Non-Profit Housing 
1087 Cummings Avenue (Gloucester)
Emily Murphy Non-Profit Housing Cooperation (Blackburn Hamlet)
Multifaith Housing Initiative
Blake House
Somerset Gardens
Kent House
Ottawa Community Housing
Albion - Heatherington (Heron Gate)
Albion Gardens (Heron Gate)
Ashgrove (Huntclub/Uplands)
Banff/Ledbury (Heron Gate)
Bathgate Court (Carson's Grove)
Beausoleil Drive (Lowertown)
Belisle (Vanier)
Bellevue Manor (Caldwell)
Britannia Woods (Ritchie)
Bronson Terrace (Centertown)
Brooke Towers (Centertown)
181 Bruyere (Lowertown)
Cairine Court (Overbrook)
1500 Caldwell (Caldwell)
Carson's road (Carson's Grove)
Clementine Towers (Billings Bridge)
Confederation Court (Russell Road)
Carson-Paul (Carson's Grove)
Charlotte Place (Lowertown)
Debra-Dynes Family House (West Ottawa)
251 Donald (Overbrook)
255 Donald (Overbrook)
Dubeau Court (Overbrook)
Fairlea Court (Heron Gate)
Foster Farm (Ramsey Crescent)
200 Friel (Lowertown)
261 Garneau (Vanier)
Golden Manor (Westboro)
Green Valley Terrace (Vanier)
Hampton Court (Hampton Park)
Heather Manor (Heron Gate)
Hooper (Carlington)
303 King Edward (Lowertown)
Lady Stanley Place (Lowertown)
MacDonald Manor (Lowertown)
MacLaren Towers (Centertown)
1433 Mayview (Carlington)
Michele Heights (Penny Drive)
Montfort/Fatima Place (Vanier)
Morrison Gardens (Draper Avenue)
380 Murray (Lowertown)
Nepean place (Centertown)
Pathway Private (Draper Avenue)
1030 Du Pere Charlebois (Vanier)
Pinecrest Terrace (Iris Street)
Queen Mary Court (Overbrook)
1065 Ramsey Crescent
Regina Towers (Lincoln Heights)
Rochester Towers (Centertown)
Rosenthal (Carlington)
Russell Gardens (Russell Road)
Russell Heights (Russell Road)
Russell Manor (Russell Road)
500 Saint Laurent Boulevard (Ottawa East)
800 Saint Laurent Boulevard (Ottawa East)
2178 Saint Laurent Boulevard (Herongate)
Shearwater Court (Hunt Club)
1180 Shillington Avenue (Carlington)
214 Somerset (Centertown)
Somerset Towers (Centertown)
Tapiola Court (Hunt Club)
Thomson Terrace (Vanier)
674 Tweedsmuir (Hampton Park)
White Fathers (Vanier)
Winthrop Court (Lincoln Heights)
215 Wurtemburg (Lowertown)
 St. Catharines
 Manchester Apartments
 Rykert Street Apartments
 Northtown Courts
 Roehampton Place
 Watermark Co-op Homes
 People's Choice Cooperative Homes
 Pinecroft Cooperative Homes Apartments
 Greenvale Cooperative Homes
 Toronto 
Regent Park (currently being revitalized)
 Lawrence Heights (planned revitalization)
 607-615 The East Mall 
 516-552 The West Mall
 Dundas/Mabelle
 44 Willowridge Road
 2063/2067 Islington Avenue
 42-44, 50 Dixington Crescent
 Ardwick Boulevard
 206-216 Duncanwoods Drive
 San Pietro Way
 710/710 Trethewey Drive
 30 Denarda Street
 4020 Dundas Street West
 3725/3735 Dundas Street West
 Swansea Mews
 136-152 Perth Avenue
 11 Randolph Avenue
 55 Rankin Crescent
 Pelham Park Gardens
 101-121 Humber Boulevard
 2468 Eglinton Avenue West
 1884 Davenport Road
 2 Antler Street
 177 Pendrith Street
 Melita Crescent
 1400 Bathurst Street
 Cabbagetown (various)
 Bleecker Street
 Lumsden Avenue
 
 Scarlettwood Court
 St. James Town
 Flemingdon Park
 Crescent Town
 Parkdale (various)
 Jane and Finch (various, including Driftwood Avenue, Shoreham Drive, 15 Tobermory Drive, 20 Yellowstone Street, Jane/Firgrove, Grandravine Drive, 1862-1901 Sheppard Avenue West)
 Kingston-Galloway (part of West Hill)
 Eglinton East (400/410 McCowan road) 
The Esplanade
Rexdale (various, including Jamestown, Mount Olive, Tandridge Crescent)
 Malvern (various, including Empringham)
 30-40 Teesdale Place
 Cataraqui-Firvalley Court
 Roywoods Drive 
 Bay Mills Boulevard
 360 Pitfield Road
 Greenbrae Circuit
 Orton Park
 2/15 Canlish Road
 1021 Birchmount Road
 20-30 Eppleworth Road
 3190 Kingston Road
 3171/3181 Eglinton Avenue East
 140 Adanac Drive
 400/410 McCowan Road
 Gilder Drive
 Allenbury Gardens
 Bishop Tutu Boulevard
 Lotherton Pathway
 Moss Park
 Mornelle Court (part of Morningside)
 Chester Le (part of L'Amoreaux)
 Glendower Circuit (part of L'Amoreaux)
 Falstaff
 Thorncliffe Park
 Willowtree (part of Willowdale)
 Danzig (part of West Hill)
 Weston (various)
 Alexandra Park
 Blake-Jones
 Don Mount Court (revitalized)
 Parma Court
 Gordonridge Place
 190 Woolner Avenue
 York Region
 Housing York Corporation
Aurora, Ontario
Hadley Grange - seniors
Charles Darrow Co-operative Housing 
Orchard Heights Place - seniors
Machell's Corners Co-operative 
Orchard Heights Place - seniors
King, Ontario
Kitchen Breedon Manor 
Kingview Court, Housing York Inc. 
Nobleview Pines, Housing York Inc. 
Richmond Hill, Ontario
76 Dunlop Pines
 Centre Green Co-operative Housing 
78 Dunlop Pines
Evergreen Terrace 
Genesis Place
John Fitzpatrick Steelworkers Housing Co-operative 
Ja'Fari Islamic Housing Jubilee Gardens 
Mackenzie Green
Landsberg/Lewis Co-operative Housing 
Maplewood Place 
Oakwill Non-Profit Homes Corporation  
Observatory Towers Richmond Hill Co-operative Homes 
Rose Town
Springbrook Gardens
St. Matthew's Non-Profit Homes 
East Gwillimbury, Ontario
 Oxford Village
Georgina, Ontario
Future Building
Keswick Gardens
Glenwood Mews
Our Lady of Smolensk Bethany Co-operative Housing 
Rixon Manor 
East Court 
Pineview Terrace
Northview Court
Newmarket, Ontario
Armitage Gardens
Alison Court 
Cedarview Lodge Bogart Creek Co-operative Housing 
German-Canadian Housing of Newmarket Inc. 
Brayfield Manors 
Heritage East
Carpenters Local 27 Housing Co-operative Inc. 
Fairy Lake Gardens 
Founders Place
Manor Green 
Tom Taylor Place
Mulock Village
Trinity Glen 
Whitchurch-Stouffville, Ontario
Parkview Village 
Elmwood Gardens
Vaughan, Ontario
Blue Willow Terrace
OHR Somayach Residential Centre 
Friuli Benevolent Corporation
Woodbridge Lane
Legion Wood Apartments
Mapleglen Residences
Maple Manor 
OHR Somayach Residential Centre 
St. Peters Senior's Residences   
Markham, Ontario
Annswell Court 
Calvary Manor 
Hagerman Corners Community Homes 
Cedar Crest Manor 
Kinsmen Non-Profit Corp. 
Robinson Street Non-Profit Homes 
Heritage Village 
Trinity Square
St. Luke's Lodge
Thornhill Green 
Thomson Court Apartments Singles

Quebec

 Montreal
 Habitations Jeanne-Mance
 Habitation Richmond
 Habitation Notre-Dame-de-Grâce
 Habitation St-Raymond
 Habitations Sherbrooke Forest
 Habitations Benny
 Plan Robert
 Plan Bellechasse
 Parc Painter
 Habitations Des Oblats
 Habitations Parc Royal
 Habitations Tolhurst
 Village Cloverdale

References 

Government in Canada
Public housing